The 1959 College Football All-America team is composed of college football players who were selected as All-Americans by various organizations and writers that chose College Football All-America Teams in 1959. The six selectors recognized by the NCAA as "official" for the 1959 season are (1) the American Football Coaches Association (AFCA), (2) the Associated Press (AP), (3) the Football Writers Association of America (FWAA), (4) the Newspaper Enterprise Association (NEA), (5) The Sporting News (TSN), and (6) the United Press International (UPI).

Billy Cannon of LSU, Charlie Flowers of Ole Miss, Dan Lanphear of Wisconsin, and Roger Davis of Syracuse were the only four players to be unanimously named first-team All-Americans by all six official selectors.  Cannon won the 1959 Heisman Trophy.

Consensus All-Americans
For the year 1959, the NCAA recognizes six published All-American teams as "official" designations for purposes of its consensus determinations. The following chart identifies the NCAA-recognized consensus All-Americans and displays which first-team designations they received.

All-American selections for 1959

Ends
Bill Carpenter, Army  (AP-3, UPI-1, NEA-1, WC, AFCA, FWAA, CP-2, TSN)
Monty Stickles, Notre Dame (AP-2, TSN, UPI-1, CP-1, WC)
Marlin McKeever, USC (AP-1, FWAA, NEA-3, UPI-3)
Chris Burford,  Stanford (AFCA, NEA-3, UPI-2, CP-2, Time)
Carroll Dale, Virginia Tech (AP-2, NEA-1, FWAA)
Jim Houston,  Ohio State (CP-1, NEA-2, UPI-2, Time)
Don Norton, Iowa (FWAA, NEA-2, UPI-3, CP-3)
Fred Mautino, Syracuse (AP-1)
Paul Maguire, The Citadel (AP-3)
 Mike Ditka, Pittsburgh (CP-3)

Tackles
Dan Lanphear, Wisconsin (AP-1, UPI-1, NEA-1, CP-1, WC, AFCA, FWAA, TSN, Time)
Don Floyd, TCU (AP-1, NEA-3, UPI-1, CP-1, WC, AFCA)
Ken Rice, Auburn (AP-2, FWAA, NEA-1, UPI-3)
Bob Yates, Syracuse (TSN)
Lou Cordileone, Clemson (AP-3, UPI-3, NEA-3, Time)
Mike Magac, Missouri (AP-2, NEA-2, CP-2)
Dan Ficca, USC (UPI-2, CP-3)
Gene Gossage, Northwestern (NEA-2, UPI-2, CP-2)
Jerry Thompson, Oklahoma (AP-3)
 Harry Olivar, Yale (CP-3)

Guards
Roger Davis, Syracuse (AP-1, UPI-1, NEA-1, CP-1, WC, AFCA, FWAA, TSN, Time)
Bill Burrell, Illinois (AP-1, NEA-3, UPI-1, CP-1, WC, FWAA)
Zeke Smith, Auburn (AFCA, TSN, UPI-2, CP-3)
Mike McGee, Duke (FWAA, NEA-2, UPI-3, CP-3, Time)
Mike McKeever, USC (AP-3, NEA-1, UPI-2)
Maurice Doke, Texas  (AP-2, FWAA)
Pat Dye, Georgia (FWAA, NEA-2)
Marvin Terrell, Mississippi (AP-3, FWAA, NEA-3, CP-2)
Jerry Stalcup, Wisconsin (AP-2, UPI-3, CP-2)

Centers
Maxie Baughan, Georgia Tech  (AP-1, UPI-1, CP-1, WC, AFCA, TSN, Time)
E. J. Holub, Texas Tech (AP-2, NEA-1, FWAA, CP-2)
Jim Andreotti, Northwestern (AP-3, FWAA)
Jackie Burkett, Auburn (UPI-2)
 Tom Goode, Mississippi State (NEA-2)
Max Fugler, LSU (UPI-3, CP-3)
 Bob Peterson, Oregon (NEA-3)

Quarterbacks
Richie Lucas, Penn State  (AFCA, AP-2, FWAA, NEA-1, TSN, UPI-1, CP-1, WC)
Don Meredith, Southern Methodist (AP-3, FWAA, NEA-2, UPI-2, Time)
Bob Schloredt, Washington (AP-1, CP-3)

Halfbacks
Billy Cannon, LSU  (AP-1, UPI-1, NEA-1, CP-1, WC, AFCA, FWAA, TSN, Time)
Ron Burton, Northwestern  (AFCA, AP-2, FWAA, NEA-1, TSN, UPI-1, CP-1, WC, Time)
Jim Mooty, Arkansas (AP-1, NEA-3)
Dean Look, Michigan State (FWAA, NEA-3 [qb], UPI-2)
Dwight Nichols, Iowa State  (AP-3, FWAA, NEA-2, UPI-3)
Fran Curci, Miami (AP-2)
Dale Hackbart, Wisconsin (UPI-2, CP-2 [qb])
Ernie Davis, Syracuse (UPI-2)
 Keith Lincoln, Washington State (NEA-2)
 Jake Crouthamel, Dartmouth (CP-2)
Tom Moore, Vanderbilt (AP-3)
Prentice Gautt, Oklahoma (UPI-3)
Gerhard Schwedes, Syracuse (UPI-3, CP-2)
 Jack Collins, Texas (NEA-3, CP-3)
 Bob Jeter, Iowa (CP-3)

Fullbacks
Charlie Flowers, Mississippi  (AP-1, UPI-1, NEA-1, CP-1, WC, AFCA, FWAA, TSN)
Bob White, Ohio State (Time)
Jack Spikes, TCU  (AP-2, FWAA, NEA-2, UPI-3, CP-2)
Don Perkins, New Mexico (AP-3)
 Sam Horner, VMI (NEA-3)
 Tom Watkins, Iowa State (CP-3)

Key

Official selectors

Other selectors

See also
 1959 All-Atlantic Coast Conference football team
 1959 All-Big Eight Conference football team
 1959 All-Big Ten Conference football team
 1959 All-Pacific Coast football team
 1959 All-SEC football team
 1959 All-Southwest Conference football team

References

All-America Team
College Football All-America Teams